Dwight Deere Wiman (August 8, 1895 – January 20, 1951) was an American silent movie actor, playwright and theatrical director.  He is best known as a Broadway producer.

Biography

Early life and education
Dwight Wiman was born in Moline, Illinois, one of two boys born to William Wiman (son of Erastus Wiman and Eleanor née Galbrith/Erastus was the son of Erastus Wyman and Therese Amelia née Matthews) and Anna Deere, a granddaughter of John Deere.  His mother died in 1906 and after his grandfather, Charles Deere, died the following year he, his father and his brother, Charles Deere Wiman, went to live with his grandmother on her estate in Moline, which was named "Overlook".  His grandmother died in 1913 and his father died in 1914.  He and his brother were cared for by his uncle and aunt, William and Katherine Butterworth who lived across the street.  Both his grandfather, uncle and brother served as president of Deere & Company.  He was sent to Todd Seminary for Boys in Woodstock, Illinois for school.  He served in the military during World War I and studied drama under Monty Woolley at Yale University.

Career
He spent two years working for Deere & Company before he and a couple of his friends organized an independent film production company, Film Guild, in Astoria, Queens from 1920 to 1924.  He acted in three silent movies during this time.  The film company suffered from marketing difficulties and it dissolved.

In 1925 he started a partnership with William A. Brady Jr.  They produced plays such as Lucky Sam McCarver (1925), the revivals of Little Eyolf and The Two Orphans in 1926, The Road to Rome (1927), and The Little Show (1929).  Their working relationship ended amicably in 1929 as Wiman was the only one interested in musical theater.  Between 1930 and 1951 he produced more than 50 shows.  The more significant productions include: The Vinegar Tree (1930), Gay Divorce (1932), She Loves Me Not (1933), On Your Toes (1936), Babes in Arms (1937), On Borrowed Time (1938), I Married an Angel (1938), Morning's at Seven (1939), By Jupiter (1942), and The Country Girl (1950).

Wiman also directed works by Paul Osborn, John Van Druten, and Clifford Odets among others.  He had a long association with Rodgers and Hart.  During World War II he served as the director of entertainment for the Red Cross in Great Britain.

Personal life & Death

Dwight Wiman was married to Dorothea Stephens.  The couple divorced in 1946.  He died in Hudson, New York in 1951 at the age of 56 and was buried in Riverside Cemetery in Moline.

Filmography
Dwight Wiman acted in the following silent films:
Youthful Cheaters (1923), as Dexter French
Puritan Passions (1923) as Richard Talbot
Peter Stuyvesant  (1924) as Charles II of England

Stage Productions
Dwight Wiman was the producer, director or writer for the following stage productions:

Ostriches (1925), producer
Lucky Sam McCarver (1925), producer
Little Eyolf, (1926), producer
The Masque of Venice (1926), producer
Devils (1926), producer
The Two Orphans (1926), producer
Seed of the Brute (1926), producerHangman's House (1926), producerThe Road to Rome (1927), producerThe Dark (1927), producerHouse of Shadows (1927), producerWomen Go On Forever (1927), producerThe Command to Love (1927), producerThe Queen's Husband (1928), producerThe Road to Rome (1928), producerThe Grey Fox (1928), producerThe Jealous Moon (1928), producerA Most Immoral Lady (1928), director, producerJudas, (1929), producerPaolo and Francesca (1929), producerThe Little Show (1929), producer, directorJenny (1929), producerThe Second Little Show (1930), writer, director, producer
The Vinegar Tree (1930), producer
The Third Little Show (1931), writer, producer
After All!  (1931), producer
Gay Divorce   (1932), producer
Bad Manners (1933), producer, director
Champagne, Sec  (1933), producer
She Loves Me Not (1933), producer
The Wooden Slipper (1934), producer
Oliver Oliver (1934), producer
The Distaff Side (1934), producer
The Distant Shore (1935), producer
Most of the Game (1935), producer
A Room in Red and White (1936), producer
On Your Toes (1936), producer
Babes in Arms (1937), producer, production supervisor
On Borrowed Time (1938), producer
I Married an Angel (1938), producer
Great Lady (1938), producer
Stars in Your Eyes (1939), Producer
Morning's at Seven (1939), producer
Leave Her To Heaven (1940), producer
Higher and Higher ( 1940), producer
Old Acquaintance (1940), producer
Letters to Lucerne (1941), producer
Solitaire (1942), producer
By Jupiter (1942), producer
The Damask Cheek (1942), producer
Street Scene (1947), producer
A Story for Strangers (1948), producer
The Big Knife (1949), producer
Dance Me a Song (1950), producer
The Country Girl (1950), producer
Romeo and Juliet (1951), producer

References

External links
Dwight Deere Wiman Papers at the Wisconsin Center for Film and Theater Research

1895 births
1951 deaths
People from Moline, Illinois
Yale University alumni
Broadway theatre directors
Broadway theatre producers
American male film actors
American male silent film actors
American theatre managers and producers
20th-century American dramatists and playwrights
Male actors from Illinois
Male actors from New York City
Writers from Illinois
Writers from New York City
20th-century American male actors